Thorman is a surname. Notable people with the surname include:

 Andrew Thorman (born 1950), English television executive
Chris Thorman (born 1980), English rugby league player
Joseph Thorman (1871–1936), English Roman Catholic bishop
Scott Thorman (born 1982), Canadian baseball player
William Henry Thorman (1869–1922), English rugby union player